Sofjan Wanandi, a.k.a. Lim Bian Khoen (born March 3, 1942) is an Indonesian businessman and the majority owner of Santini Group. Born in Sawahlunto, West Sumatra, he is the brother of Jusuf Wanandi, a senior politician and one of the founders of the CSIS think tank in Jakarta.

An anti-communist activist during the 1965-1966 period in Indonesia, Sofjan has been active in business, government, and politics.

Career and education 
While studying at the University of Indonesia, Sofjan became the chairman of the Catholic Student Association of the Republic of Indonesia (PMKRI). Following the alleged coup attempt by the Indonesian Communist Party (PKI) in Indonesia, he was involved in the campaign to suppress PKI. He later became chairman of WE continue with Jaya.

Even prior to the coup attempt, he was active in efforts to oppose PKI's growing influence. As one of the leaders of the Indonesian Students Action Union, his political activism resulted in his imprisonment by the Sukarno government. He was released after five days in jail.

After Soeharto took power from Sukarno, Sofjan joined Suharto's political vehicle, Golkar. Sofjan was close to Suharto aides Ali Murtopo and Soedjono Hoemardani.

In 1974, Sofjan founded the Pakarti Yoga Group of industrial and trading companies. In 1984, he founded Gemala Group, which in 1994 was reincarnated as Santini Group. In 2008, Santini Group had over 15,000 employees, including those working abroad in Australia and Canada. Sofjan led several large companies such as Tata Vehicle insurance, battery manufacturer PT Yuasa Battery Indonesia, and pharmaceutical manufacturers.

He was elected general chairman of the Indonesian Employers Association (Apindo) for the 2008-2013 period. He had led Apindo in a previous five-year period.

References

Living people
1942 births
Indonesian Roman Catholics
Indonesian businesspeople
Indonesian people of Chinese descent